John George Agar Jr. (January 31, 1921 – April 7, 2002) was an American film and television actor. He is best known for starring alongside John Wayne in the films Sands of Iwo Jima, Fort Apache, and She Wore a Yellow Ribbon. In his later career he was the star of B movies, such as Tarantula!, The Mole People, The Brain from Planet Arous, Revenge of the Creature, Flesh and the Spur and Hand of Death. He was the first husband of Shirley Temple.

Agar's career suffered in the wake of his divorce, but he developed a niche playing leading men in low-budget science fiction, Western, and horror movies in the 1950s and 1960s. John Wayne gave him several supporting roles in the late 1960s and early 1970s. In later years he worked extensively in television.

Early life and military service
Agar was born in Chicago, Illinois, the son of Lillian (née Rogers) and John George Agar, a meat packer. His great aunt was Edna Gladney. He was educated at the Harvard School for Boys in Chicago  and Lake Forest Academy in Lake Forest, Illinois. He graduated from Trinity-Pawling Preparatory School in Pawling, New York, but did not attend college. He and his family moved from Chicago to Los Angeles in 1942, after his father's death.

In 1941, Agar joined the Navy Air Corps, had basic training in Texas, and instructed in physical training at March Field in Riverside, California. He was medically discharged from the Navy in 1943 due to an ear infection that affected his balance. He then enlisted in the United States Army Air Corps. He was a sergeant and a physical training instructor at the time he left the AAF in 1946.

Career
Agar met Shirley Temple in 1943 when he was asked to escort her to a Hollywood party.

After his marriage with Temple in 1945, her boss at the time, David O. Selznick, signed Agar to a five-year acting contract starting at $150 a week, including acting lessons.  Agar made his film debut as Temple's love interest in Fort Apache (1948), a John Ford western for RKO starring John Wayne and Henry Fonda. It was a financial and critical success.

Agar was reunited with Temple for his second film, a suffragette drama Adventure in Baltimore (1949), also for RKO, which was a huge flop.

RKO used him in The Woman on Pier 13 (1950), an anti-communist drama that was a pet project of Howard Hughes. It was Agar's first movie without Temple, and he was billed after Robert Ryan and Laraine Day. It was another flop.

More successful was a reunion with Wayne and Ford, She Wore a Yellow Ribbon (1949), in which Agar played the romantic lead. It was a sizeable hit and has come to be regarded as a classic.  Even more popular was the World War II film Sands of Iwo Jima (1949) where Agar supported John Wayne. Made by Republic Pictures, it was a sizeable hit, earning Wayne an Oscar nomination and getting Agar some good reviews. Toward the end of his life, Agar blamed John Wayne for getting him hooked on cigarettes and alcohol, two addictive habits that would later ruin his life.

Warner Bros put Agar in a war film, Breakthrough (1950) which relied extensively on pre-existing war footage. It was a reasonable success at the box office.

Warner Bros used him in Along the Great Divide (1951), supporting Kirk Douglas. He made a low budget Arabian Knights film for Sam Katzman with Lucille Ball, The Magic Carpet (1951).

In 1952 Agar was fired by Selznick for driving under the influence of alcohol, which affected his career with the large studios in Hollywood.

Agar was third billed in Woman of the North Country (1952), a Western for Republic, and also starred in Man of Conflict (1953), an independent drama with Edward Arnold.

Agar had support roles in Bait (1954), a Hugo Haas drama with Cleo Moore; The Rocket Man (1954), a Charles Coburn comedy co-written by Lenny Bruce; and Shield for Murder (1954), a film noir starring and co-directed by Edmond O'Brien.

Agar returned to leading roles in The Golden Mistress (1954), an adventure film directed by Abner Biberman.

In 1954 Agar signed a seven-year contract with Universal. He began the association with Revenge of the Creature (1955), the popular first sequel to Creature from the Black Lagoon (1954); it was produced by William Alland and directed by Jack Arnold.  He was borrowed by Lippert Pictures for The Lonesome Trail (1955), then, at Universal, made a second film for Haas with Cleo Moore, Hold Back Tomorrow (1955).

Agar made another science fiction film, Tarantula! (1955), made by Alland and Arnold, which was popular and became a cult favorite.

Universal starred him in a Western, Star in the Dust (1956) with Mamie Van Doren and Richard Boone and produced by Albert Zugsmith. A new company, American International Pictures, borrowed Agar for a Western, Flesh and the Spur (1956) with Marla English and Mike Connors (billed as "Touch Connors"). Then he went back to Universal for The Mole People (1956), produced by Alland.

His contract with Universal ended when he complained that he was tired of only doing science fiction roles. His final film with the studio was supporting Universal's Western star Audie Murphy in a comedy Joe Butterfly (1957).

He remained in demand for low budget science fiction, horror and Western films. He starred in The Daughter of Dr. Jekyll (1957) for Edgar G. Ulmer at Allied Artists, then made The Brain from Planet Arous (1957) for Howco International.

Agar starred in some low budget Westerns for Lippert's low budget Regal Films at Fox, Ride a Violent Mile (1958) and Frontier Gun (1958). He went to the Philippines to make Cavalry Command (1958) and did two for AIP, Jet Attack (1958) and Attack of the Puppet People (1958). He shot a television pilot in 1958 that was released as a feature film Destination Space (1959).

He did Invisible Invaders (1958) for director Edward L. Cahn who had made Jet Attack.

Agar could be seen in Journey to the Seventh Planet (1962) and  Of Love and Desire (1963). He joined he ensemble casts in several low budget films for producer A.C. Lyles that were released by Paramount Pictures; The Young and The Brave (1963) with Rory Calhoun, Law of the Lawless (1963) starring Dale Robertson and William Bendix, Stage to Thunder Rock (1965) with Barry Sullivan and Marilyn Maxwell, Young Fury (1965) with Rory Calhoun and Lon Chaney Jr., Johnny Reno (1966) with Dana Andrews and Jane Russell, and Waco (1966) with Howard Keel, Jane Russell and Brian Donlevy.

He made some films for Larry Buchanan at AIP that were originally meant as made-for-television-movies, Curse of the Swamp Creature (1966), Zontar, the Thing from Venus (1966) and Hell Raiders (1968). He had the lead in Women of the Prehistoric Planet (1966) and Night Fright (1967).

He had small parts in some studio films like The St. Valentine's Day Massacre (1967) with Jason Robards Jr. and Ralph Meeker, and three more pictures in a row with John Wayne: The Undefeated (1969), Chisum (1970), and Big Jake (1971).

His last prominent roles were small parts in King Kong (1976), Miracle Mile (1988) and Nightbreed (1990).

Personal life

Marriages
Agar's sister was a schoolmate of Shirley Temple. In 1944 Agar escorted Temple to a party held by her boss at the time, David O. Selznick. The two were married in 1945. Agar and Temple had a daughter together, Linda Susan Agar, born 1948 (who was later known as Susan Black, taking the surname of her stepfather, Charles Alden Black). However, the marriage foundered, in part because of Agar's drinking (he had been arrested for drunk driving) and in part because of pressures of their high public profile. Temple sued for divorce on the grounds of mental cruelty in 1949. The two were divorced on December 7, 1950. After the divorce, Agar had little contact with his daughter or with Temple.

Agar remarried in 1951 to model Loretta Barnett Combs (1922–2000). They tried to elope but officials refused to marry them for an hour because Agar had been drinking. They remained married for 49 years until her death in 2000. They had two sons, Martin Agar and John G. Agar, III.

Legal issues
In 1950 Agar was fined for reckless driving. In 1951 he was sentenced to five months in jail for drunk driving, and released on probation after 60 days. In 1953 Agar was again arrested for drunk driving, and sentenced to 120 days in prison. In 1960 he was again arrested for drunk driving.

Political views

Agar supported Barry Goldwater in the 1964 United States presidential election, and Ronald Reagan in 1980.

Death
Agar died on April 7, 2002, in Burbank, California from severe complications from emphysema. He was 81. He was buried beside his wife at Riverside National Cemetery in Riverside, California.

Legacy
As for being associated with science fiction B movies, Agar said, "I don't resent being identified with B science fiction movies at all", Agar later said. "Why should I? Even though they were not considered top-of-the-line, for those people that like sci-fi, I guess they were fun. My whole feeling about working as an actor is, if I give anybody any enjoyment, I'm doing my job, and that's what counts."

The Seattle band The Young Fresh Fellows recorded the songs "The New John Agar" and "Agar's Revenge" on the Topsy Turvy album in 1985.

The television series Mystery Science Theater 3000 has made fun of several of Agar's films, including The Mole People, Women of the Prehistoric Planet and Revenge of the Creature.

Filmography

Film

Television

Video games

References

External links

The Official John Agar Website

Interview with John Agar III at Scar Monsters Magazine

1921 births
2002 deaths
20th-century American male actors
Burials at Riverside National Cemetery
Respiratory disease deaths in California
Deaths from emphysema
American male film actors
Male actors from Chicago
United States Navy personnel of World War II
Lake Forest Academy alumni
Military personnel from California
Military personnel from Illinois
United States Army Air Forces personnel of World War II
United States Army Air Forces soldiers
United States Navy sailors